Ibac is a fictional character appearing in American comic books published by Fawcett Comics and DC Comics. He is often depicted as a foe of Captain Marvel.

Publication history
Created by writer Otto Binder and artist C.C. Beck, he first appeared in Captain Marvel Adventures #8 (March 6, 1942).

Fictional character biography

Earth-S
Ibac's alter-ego is Stanley "Stinky" Printwhistle, a crook who attempts to blow up a bridge, but is caught in the explosion and thrown off due to Captain Marvel. He is saved by Lucifer, who offers Printwhistle the chance to become a champion of evil and defeat Captain Marvel in exchange for his mortal soul. Printwhistle accepts, Lucifer summons up four historical villains, and Printwhistle is told to speak the magic word "IBAC". By doing so, the frail, grey-haired criminal transforms into Ibac, a brutal muscleman with a buzz cut. Saying "IBAC" again transforms Ibac back into Printwhistle.

When he first appears he is defeated when Captain Marvel hits him so hard he seems to knock the evil power from him, in the form of leaving Printwhistle and the four other villains in front of him, the four fade away quietly, but Ibac later returns when the evil spirits contact him. Captain Marvel whirls Ibac around so fast that the four evil spirits separate from him. Because he has not been able to defeat Captain Marvel, Printwhistle has not been obliged to give his soul to the devil, and has reformed, but being weak-willed, he has often been forced by other criminals into becoming the evil Ibac again.

In his first Silver Age appearance, the spirits of the villains who gave him his powers telepathically communicate with him, and force him to become Ibac as he has reformed and been a street sweeper for the last ten years. They order him to capture, then destroy, Billy. He succeeds in surprising, capturing, and leaving a bound and gagged Billy in a building about to be blown up, but Billy is able to use a recording of his voice to summon Captain Marvel and beat up Ibac. After being defeated, his benefactors withdraw their powers from him. Ibac was a member of both the Pre-Crisis Monster Society of Evil during WW II, in which he nearly killed Billy in Africa after giving him bound and gagged to cannibals, and the Society formed years later.

While Captain Marvel is empowered by six mythological and Biblical figures, Ibac is empowered by four of the most evil and terrifying men to have ever walked the earth: Ivan the Terrible, who supplies Terror, Cesare Borgia, who gives Ibac Cunning, Attila the Hun, who gifts him with Fierceness, and Caligula, the sponsor of Cruelty. While Captain Marvel transforms using magic lightning bolts, Ibac's transformations are accomplished with the power of mystical green fire and brimstone. This also gives him superhuman strength and stamina. In his second appearance in Captain Marvel Adventures #9 Beautia Sivana saying 'Ibac' next to Ibac after his transformation transforms her into a black haired woman wearing a black dress, though she still has her own personality and turns back when saying 'Ibac' again.

At the time when King Kull causes trouble for Earth-One, Earth-Two, and Earth-S, he enlists Ibac, Penguin of Earth-One, Queen Clea of Earth-Two, and Blockbuster of Earth-One for his attack on Earth-Two, where he tries to wreck Atlantis and use a cloud to sink islands. This brings them into conflict with Superman of Earth-One, Wonder Woman of Earth-Two, Green Arrow of Earth-One, and Spy Smasher of Earth-S. Spy Smasher battles Ibac and is on the verge of losing when he remembers what Captain Marvel told him of the villain. Spy Smasher then taunts the dim-witted villain bty telling him to "back down". Ibac responds proudly "I back down for nobody!" The phonetic "I back" causes him to revert to Stinky Printwhistle's form.

Ibac's original benefactor Prince Lucifer gives him greater power briefly, but he turns back on purpose to escape the affections of Aunt Minerva after getting advice from Solomon.

Post-Crisis
In the Post-Crisis, Ibac's origin is the same as his Earth-S counterpart.

Ibac has turned up in Villains United during the Infinite Crisis storyline as a member of the Secret Society of Super Villains.

One Year Later, Ibac appeared in the Secret Six series, still with the Society, battling the second Ragdoll on the orders of the Society. Ragdoll escapes, leaving a wounded Ibac.

Ibac is seen among the captured villains in Salvation Run. There, he is in Camp Lex and starts an argument with the people that are not working to help build the machine they need to escape back to Earth.

Ibac was also in the DC Holiday Special '09 issue fighting Captain Marvel once again, but in the spirit of the holiday, cease fighting and work together to rebuild what they destroyed during their brawl. Captain Marvel gives him amnesty to walk away free. In the last panel, both are shown at a soup kitchen in their human forms, but neither recognizes the other's alter-ego.

The New 52
In 2011, The New 52 rebooted the DC universe. During the Forever Evil storyline, "Ibac the First" is depicted as an evil barbaric ruler who enslaved the Kahndaq people before being defeated and turned into stone by Black Adam whose family he murdered. Centuries later, one of his descendants takes the name of Ibac II only to be also killed by Adam.

Powers and abilities
Ibac has immense strength (almost on par with Captain Marvel, but not equally as strong), stamina, durability, and speed, which he gets by saying "IBAC". He turns back also by saying "IBAC" making him, like Captain Marvel Jr., unable to identify himself via name. In his Ibac form, Stanley possesses the following attributes:

 I for the Terror of Ivan the Terrible - Superhuman Stamina
 B for the Cunning of Cesare Borgia - Superhuman Durability
 A for the Fierceness of Attila the Hun - Superhuman Strength
 C for the Cruelty of Caligula - Superhuman Speed

The Pre-Crisis version claimed not to have invulnerability, but he was very resistant.

In other media
Ibac appears in The Kid Super Power Hour with Shazam! episode "Best Seller". He sends the Marvel Family a special book which is a transporter that enabled the Hiss-Men to capture Billy Batson, Mary Batson, and Freddy Freeman while they are sleeping and bring them to Ibac with their mouths gagged. He plans to attack humanity in prehistoric times, allowing the Hiss-Men to take over by using a machine called the "People Processor" which turns humans into Hiss-Men and kidnapping humans from the present. Ibac is defeated and left in the past being chased by a dinosaur while the Marvels take the technology.

Ibac makes a brief cameo in Batman: The Brave and the Bold episode "The Malicious Mr. Mind!". He is seen as one of the members of the Monster Society of Evil fighting against the Marvel Family and Batman.

Ibac is mentioned in the Young Justice episode "Misplaced". Cat Grant is reading a news report that states he and Sabbac had been defeated by Captain Marvel earlier in the day.

Ibac appears in the DC Nation short "SHAZAM!: Courage", voiced by David Kaye.

References

External links
 Ibac at Comic Vine

Golden Age supervillains
DC Comics supervillains
Fawcett Comics supervillains
Comics characters introduced in 1942
DC Comics characters who can move at superhuman speeds
DC Comics characters who use magic
DC Comics characters with superhuman strength
Fictional characters with superhuman durability or invulnerability
Characters created by Otto Binder
Characters created by C. C. Beck
Male characters in comics
Captain Marvel (DC Comics)

de:Captain Marvel#Ibac